Øy-Blikk (the Island Glance) is a local Norwegian newspaper published in the municipality of Giske in Møre og Romsdal county. 

Øy-Blikk was established in 1985 by Odd Egil Valderhaug. It is a weekly newspaper and it appears on Thursdays. The newspaper is published in Nynorsk. Its office is located in Valderøy, and it is edited by Hilde Røsvik. The newspaper is governed by the Ethical Code of Practice for the Norwegian Press.

Circulation
According to the Norwegian Audit Bureau of Circulations and National Association of Local Newspapers, Øy-Blikk has had the following annual circulation:
2004: 1,760
2005: 1,801
2006: 1,805
2007: 1,864
2008: 1,699
2009: 1,839
2010: 1,838
2011: 1,746
2012: 1,674
2013: 1,434
2014: 1,548
2015: 1,436
2016: 1,297

References

External links
Øy-Blikk homepage

1985 establishments in Norway
Giske
Mass media in Møre og Romsdal
Newspapers established in 1985
Newspapers published in Norway
Norwegian-language newspapers
Nynorsk